Winters is a city in rural Yolo County, and the western Sacramento Valley, in northern California.

The population of Winters was 6,624 as of the 2010 Census. It is part of the Sacramento–Arden-Arcade–Yuba City, CA-NV Combined Statistical Area.

Geography
Winters is a small city located on Putah Creek in the western Sacramento Valley, near the northeastern Vaca Mountains foothills.

It is situated along Interstate 505,  from Vacaville.

History
William Wolfskill, a Kentucky immigrant to Mexican Alta California, received a Mexican land grant for Rancho Rio de los Putos in 1842 from Governor Juan Bautista Alvarado.  His brother, John Reid Wolfskill, started the agricultural development of the Sacramento Valley by planting orchards and vineyards on his lands.  In 1849, William Wolfskill transferred half of Rancho Rio de los Putos to John Wolfskill, and transferred the rest to his brother in 1854.

The Winters post office was established in 1875. Winters incorporated in 1898. The name honors Theodore Winters, whose ranch provided half of the town's land.

In 1935, Wolfskill's heirs deeded 100 acres of the Wolfskill Ranch in Winters to the University of California, Davis, which had been founded in 1908. The land was to be used for an experimental orchard.

Climate
Winters has hot, mostly dry summers and cool, wet winters. According to the Köppen climate classification system, Winters has a hot-summer Mediterranean climate (Csa).

There are an average of 64 days with measurable precipitation. Snowfall is a rarity in Winters, but  fell in January 1973 and  fell in December 1988.

<div style="width:75%">

</div style>

Government
Federal
California's 4th congressional district

State
California's 3rd State Senate district
California's 4th State Assembly district

City
The current elected members of the Winters City Council are:
 Mayor — Wade Cowan
 Mayor Pro-Tempore — Bill Biasi 
 Council Member — Jesse Loren
 Council Member — Harold Anderson 
 Council Member — Pierre Neu

Other elected or appointed city officials include:

 City Manager — Kathleen Trepa
 Police Chief John P. Miller
 Fire Chief Brad Lopez

Economy

Top employers
According to Winters' 2017 Comprehensive Annual Financial Report, the top employers in the city are:

Demographics

2010
At the 2010 census Winters had a population of 6,624. The racial makeup of Winters was 4,635 (70.0%) White, 43 (0.6%) African American, 56 (0.8%) Native American, 63 (1.0%) Asian, 7 (0.1%) Pacific Islander, 1,488 (22.5%) from other races, and 332 (5.0%) from two or more races. Hispanic or Latino of any race were 3,469 persons (52.4%).

The census reported that 6,618 people (99.9% of the population) lived in households, 6 (0.1%) lived in non-institutionalized group quarters, and no one was institutionalized.

There were 2,186 households, 949 (43.4%) had children under the age of 18 living in them, 1,322 (60.5%) were opposite-sex married couples living together, 255 (11.7%) had a female householder with no husband present, 134 (6.1%) had a male householder with no wife present.  There were 123 (5.6%) unmarried opposite-sex partnerships, and 16 (0.7%) same-sex married couples or partnerships. 365 households (16.7%) were one person and 134 (6.1%) had someone living alone who was 65 or older. The average household size was 3.03.  There were 1,711 families (78.3% of households); the average family size was 3.40.

The age distribution was 1,707 people (25.8%) under the age of 18, 741 people (11.2%) aged 18 to 24, 1,707 people (25.8%) aged 25 to 44, 1,868 people (28.2%) aged 45 to 64, and 601 people (9.1%) who were 65 or older.  The median age was 35.9 years. For every 100 females, there were 102.4 males.  For every 100 females age 18 and over, there were 100.9 males.

There were 2,299 housing units at an average density of 782.7 per square mile, of the occupied units 1,425 (65.2%) were owner-occupied and 761 (34.8%) were rented. The homeowner vacancy rate was 1.7%; the rental vacancy rate was 5.0%.  4,401 people (66.4% of the population) lived in owner-occupied housing units and 2,217 people (33.5%) lived in rental housing units.

2000
At the 2000 census there were 6,125 people in 1,907 households, including 1,546 families, in the city. The population density was 860.0/km (2,226.6/mi2). There were 1,954 housing units at an average density of 274.3/km (710.3/mi2).  The racial makeup of the city was 69.81% White, 0.67% African American, 0.88% Native American, 1.00% Asian, 0.28% Pacific Islander, 22.56% from other races, and 4.80% from two or more races. Hispanic or Latino of any race were 44.41%.

Of the 1,907 households 48.9% had children under the age of 18 living with them, 64.1% were married couples living together, 12.8% had a female householder with no husband present, and 18.9% were non-families. 14.5% of households were one person and 6.3% were one person aged 65 or older. The average household size was 3.21 and the average family size was 3.56.

The age distribution was 33.3% under the age of 18, 8.9% from 18 to 24, 30.9% from 25 to 44, 19.1% from 45 to 64, and 7.8% 65 or older. The median age was 31 years. For every 100 females, there were 103.1 males. For every 100 females age 18 and over, there were 97.5 males.

The median household income was $48,678 and the median family income  was $55,183. Males had a median income of $40,257 versus $27,662 for females. The per capita income for the city was $17,133. About 4.2% of families and 5.0% of the population were below the poverty line, including 4.4% of those under age 18 and 5.9% of those age 65 or over.

Notable people

 Robert Crumb, cartoonist, lived in Winters until 1991
 Frank Demaree, Major League Baseball player
 Robert Craig McNamara, owner of Sierra Orchards and son of Robert S. McNamara, Secretary of the Department of Defense
 Catherine Squires (1941–2021), microbiologist
John Reid Wolfskill, Winters pioneer

See also
1892 Vacaville–Winters earthquakes

References

Sources

External links

 
Cities in Yolo County, California
Cities in Sacramento metropolitan area
Sacramento Valley
Populated places established in 1898
1898 establishments in California
Incorporated cities and towns in California